Kratochvilia is a genus of spiders in the family Mimetidae. It was first described in 1934 by Strand. , it contains only one species, Kratochvilia pulvinata, found on Príncipe.

References

Mimetidae
Monotypic Araneomorphae genera
Spiders of Africa